Franco A. "Frank" Barsotti (November 20, 1937, - June 6, 2012) was an American photographer. Youngest of three children, he was born and raised in Chicago's historic Pullman area by Italian immigrant parents. Italy, where he returned often, was a common theme through much of his work, such as the series Italy 1974 and White.

His noted series Artigiano consists of photographs of tools hand-made by his father.

Though trained in traditional black-and-white photography, Franco embraced digital technology and was one of the earliest professors to work with digital photography.

Franco received a Bachelor of Science Degree in Photography from the Institute of Design at Illinois Institute of Technology, where he studied under Harry Callahan and Aaron Siskind. He attended the graduate program in photography at Ohio University in Athens, Ohio, and received a Master of Fine Arts in Photography from the School of the Art Institute of Chicago, where he also taught for 38 years.

The following is an excerpt from a statement from the School of the Art Institute of Chicago upon Frank Barsotti's death on June 6, 2012:

Though living in Washington State for the [last] 10 years [of his life], Frank was born and raised in Chicago's historic Pullman area and spent the majority of his life in and dedicated to Chicago. He taught alongside Joyce Niemanas, Barbara Crane, and Ken Josephson, and during his years at SAIC taught nearly 2,000 students.

References

External links
 Franco A Barsotti official website 
 In Memory: Frank T. Barsotti (MFA 1969)
 Barsotti Combines Art And Kitsch In Photo Fables
 Barsotti Gives Old Ways The Brush, Paints In New Frontier
 The Art Institute of Chicago Private Collection: Frank Barsotti
 Museum of Contemporary Photography, Columbia College Chicago: Frank Barsotti

1937 births
2012 deaths
American people of Italian descent
Artists from Chicago
American photographers